Malcolm Charles Grimston (born 1 May 1958) is a British advocate of nuclear power, and is also a scientific author, based at the Centre for Energy Policy and Technology at Imperial College London. He has featured extensively on British television and radio in context of the latest new-build power stations for nuclear power in the United Kingdom.

Early life
Grimston was born in Cleethorpes, now in North East Lincolnshire, then in Lindsey. He grew up in North Yorkshire, attending the independent Scarborough College. He studied natural sciences at Magdalene College, Cambridge, where he graduated in 1979.  He subsequently took a Postgraduate Certificate in Education (PGCE), again at Magdalene Cambridge.

Career
Grimston taught chemistry for seven years from 1980, at Stowe and Millfield schools. From 1987-92 he was an information officer at the United Kingdom Atomic Energy Authority (UKAEA). From 1992-95 he was an information officer at the British Nuclear Industry Forum (now called the Nuclear Industry Association). From 1999-2002 he was also at the Royal Institute of International Affairs, also known as Chatham House.

Since 1995, Grimston has worked at the Imperial Centre for Energy Policy and Technology at Imperial College, as a senior research fellow until 1999 and an honorary senior research fellow since then.

Publications
 Double or Quits – the global future of civil nuclear energy (with Peter Beck, Earthscan Books, 2002) 
 Civil nuclear energy – fuel of the future or relic of the past? (with Peter Beck, Chatham House 2000)
 The paralysis in energy decision-making (Whittle Publishing, September 2016)
 West Hill and Wimbledon Park Side - Story of a Council Ward (Authorhouse, November 2018)

Personal life
Grimston lives in Wandsworth. He is a councillor on Wandsworth London Borough Council, where he has represented West Hill ward since 1994. In 2014, he left the Conservative Party to sit as an  Independent.

In 2018, he was re-elected with 4,002 votes. This  was  the highest individual result recorded for any candidate in Wandsworth and in Greater London.

See also
 :Category:Books about nuclear issues

References

1958 births
Academics of Imperial College London
Alumni of Magdalene College, Cambridge
Schoolteachers from Lincolnshire
People associated with nuclear power
People educated at Scarborough College
People from Cleethorpes
People from Tooting
Science teachers
Living people
Chatham House people
Councillors in the London Borough of Wandsworth
Independent councillors in the United Kingdom